The 1989 Tasmanian state election was held on 13 May 1989.

Retiring Members

Liberal
John Beattie MLA (Franklin)

House of Assembly
Sitting members are shown in bold text. Tickets that elected at least one MHA are highlighted in the relevant colour. Successful candidates are indicated by an asterisk (*).

Bass
Seven seats were up for election. The Labor Party was defending three seats. The Liberal Party was defending four seats.

Braddon
Seven seats were up for election. The Labor Party was defending three seats. The Liberal Party was defending four seats.

Denison
Seven seats were up for election. The Labor Party was defending three seats. The Liberal Party was defending three seats. The Green Independents were defending one seat.

Franklin
Seven seats were up for election. The Labor Party was defending two seats. The Liberal Party was defending four seats. The Green Independents were defending one seat.

Lyons
Seven seats were up for election. The Labor Party was defending three seats. The Liberal Party was defending four seats.

See also
 Members of the Tasmanian House of Assembly, 1986–1989
 Members of the Tasmanian House of Assembly, 1989–1992

References
Tasmanian Parliamentary Library

Candidates for Tasmanian state elections